Prince of Qin is a 2002 action role-playing game developed by Object Software and published by Strategy First. The story is set in China in the final years of the Qin dynasty (221–206 BC), with Fusu – the heir apparent to the first Qin emperor, Qin Shi Huang – as the protagonist. Although the game has a historical basis, its setting is purely fictitious because the historical Fusu died in 210 BC.

Gameplay
The game balances team-fighting, with up to five heroes per team, and the use of various skills and abilities. The player is challenged by many enemies in more than 100 unique scenes accurately depicting the society and architecture of the Qin dynasty. The game's novel features include multi-scenario and multi-ending systems, randomly created weapons, items and enemies, an equipment-creating system and a sophisticated fighting system rooted in the ancient Chinese philosophy of the Five Elements.

Plot
There are a total of 13 chapters in the story. In each chapter, the player has to accomplish a primary goal in order to proceed to the next chapter. The player may concurrently accept some secondary missions as well and complete them in any chapter before the finale.

Fusu, the Crown Prince of the Qin Empire, is ordered to commit suicide according to an imperial decree by his father, the First Emperor. General Meng Tian suspects something is wrong with the order and stops Fusu. Fusu flees from Shangjun with Meng Tian's help and arrives in the nearby Zhaocun Village. He makes a long and perilous journey back to the capital, Xianyang, to uncover the truth. Fusu is shocked to hear that his father had died and that his youngest brother, Huhai, has ascended the throne as the Second Emperor. He meets his childhood friend, General Huan Feng, and learns that there is something fishy about his father's death. He decides to enter his father's tomb to investigate.

Fusu seeks help from Xiao Qi, a craftsman well-versed in the techniques of laying traps. Xiao Qi sends his apprentice, Jing Wuji, to accompany Fusu on his quest. They need to find Tian Gang, an expert who was involved in the construction of the tomb, to find out how to enter the tomb. Fusu learns from Tian Gang that he needs to be equipped with two items before entering the tomb: a Gold Toad Pearl to neutralise the poisonous vapour in the tomb; one of seven magical swords (Ou Yezi's five masterpieces and the Gan Jiang and Mo Ye swords) to destroy the Dark Alloy Gate in the tomb. Fusu finds the items after a series of adventures around China. He navigates his way through the labyrinthine tomb, fights some terracotta soldiers in the process, and finally reaches the inner chamber where the First Emperor is buried. He examines his father's body and is shocked to discover that his father was strangled to death and had been poisoned over a long period of time.

After leaving the tomb, Fusu meets Fang Zhong, who tells him that rebellions have erupted all over the Qin Empire due to the tyranny of the Second Emperor. He decides to help the rebels, but feels disheartened after witnessing how the internal conflict between the rebel forces led by Chen Sheng and others resulted in their failure and destruction. Upon hearing that Liu Bang, whom he met earlier, had also rebelled and formed his own army, he joins Liu and helps him recapture Fengxian County from a traitor. Later, he also persuades his childhood friend, Li You, the Qin general defending Sanchuan Prefecture, to surrender to Liu Bang. In the meantime, Li You's father, the Prime Minister Li Si, is framed for treason and imprisoned by Zhao Gao, an evil eunuch who has been manipulating the Second Emperor. With help from Huan Feng, Fusu and Li You break into the prison to save Li Si. However, they fail in their attempt when Huan Feng, who is being controlled by Zhao Gao's magic, betrays them and lures them into a trap. They manage to escape from the prison after Fusu defeats and reluctantly kills Huan Feng.

Fusu travels to Julu to meet Xiang Yu and update himself on the progress of the rebel forces. Xiang Yu has just emerged victorious in the Battle of Julu against the Qin army led by Zhang Han. He orders all the 200,000 prisoners-of-war to be buried alive as a sacrifice to his uncle, Xiang Liang, who was killed in an earlier battle against Qin forces. Disappointed by Xiang Yu's barbaric actions and ill-disciplined army, Fusu leaves Julu and goes to join Liu Bang, whom he feels is a better leader as compared to Xiang. He draws the comparison between Liu Bang and Xiang Yu to that between himself and his father. In his final mission in helping Liu Bang, he infiltrates Wancheng and convinces the Qin governor to surrender to the rebels.

Fusu leaves Liu Bang and goes to the Epang Palace to confront the Second Emperor. He arrives too late because Zhao Gao had already sent assassins to kill Huhai. Before dying, Huhai confesses to Fusu that he abetted Zhao Gao in murdering the First Emperor and blames Zhao for the Qin Empire's downfall. In the final chapter, Fusu breaks into Zhao Gao's underground palace and kills him in revenge. There are many endings to the game. The ending the player gets depends on the quests completed in the game.

Reception

The game received "mixed" reviews, according to video game review aggregators GameRankings and Metacritic.

References

External links
 

2002 video games
Action role-playing video games
Fantasy video games
Strategy First games
Video games based on Chinese mythology
Video games developed in China
Windows games
Windows-only games